The 1943 Liège–Bastogne–Liège was the 30th edition of the Liège–Bastogne–Liège cycle race and was held on 27 June 1943. The race started and finished in Liège. The race was won by Richard Depoorter.

General classification

References

1943
1943 in Belgian sport